Defending champions Diede de Groot and Aniek van Koot defeated Marjolein Buis and Sabine Ellerbrock in the final, 6–1, 6–1 to win the women's doubles wheelchair tennis title at the 2019 French Open. It was their second step towards an eventual Grand Slam.

Seeds

Draw

Finals

References
 Draw

Wheelchair Women's Doubles
French Open, 2019 Women's Doubles